Metin Türkcan is a Turkish musician and guitarist born in 1971. Besides his solo career, his most notable works are with the Turkish heavy-metal band Mezarkabul (also known as Pentagram) and with Şebnem Ferah.

References

External links
 Biography on the website of Pentagram
 Biography on the website of Şebnem Ferah

Turkish guitarists
1971 births
Living people
21st-century guitarists